Sayd is a fictional character in the DC Comics universe. She is a member of the Guardians of the Universe. Where most of the Guardians are void of emotion and rigid in their compliance to standard policy, Sayd's sensibilities are more in line with those of Ganthet, a Guardian known for his non-traditional mindset, and the two eventually entered a romantic relationship and later married.

Fictional character biography
In Green Lantern (vol. 3) #150 Kyle Rayner (as Ion) relights the Central Power Battery on Oa and restores the dead Guardians to life. However they were restored as children in a mix of male and female instead of adult males (their original forms). Sayd was one of the reborn members of the Guardians of the Universe, and one of the six female (out of twelve total) members of the organization.

Book of Oa
In Green Lantern (vol. 4) #24, Sayd reads a forbidden chapter from the Book of Oa, which foretells of a prophecy of cosmic revelations: "The Blackest Night". When the threat of the Sinestro Corps endangers the entire multiverse, Sayd addresses the incident to her colleagues as a sign from "The Blackest Night". The other Guardians dismiss her concerns and ignore the prophecy, assuming it to be folklore and an attempt by their enemies, the 5 Inversions, to spread fear amongst them. During the war, she and Ganthet oppose the other Guardians' stance on the prophecy and attempt to stop them from burning the pages from the Book of Oa, though they are unsuccessful. Near the end of the war, they are banished from the Guardian Council for "acting on emotion" (an accusation which includes the two apparently being in love with one another). She and Ganthet later appear on Earth to trap Parallax inside the four Earth-based Lanterns' power batteries, after which Ganthet offers Kyle Rayner his old power ring back (after being freed of the fear entity and no longer serving as Ion). They both claim that as they are no longer Guardians, they cannot help defeat the Sinestro Corps, but will attempt to help how they can, to which Guy Gardner responds "Guardians bein' mysterious and ambiguous -- There's something new".

At the end of the Sinestro Corps War plotline, Ganthet and Sayd are shown living on the planet Odym. There they harness the blue energy of hope, one of the lights of the emotional spectrum. In preparation for "The Blackest Night" and motivated by their hope for life in the universe, they plan the formation of their own Corps: the Blue Lanterns. Combining their abilities to form the first blue power ring, both Guardians evolve into two new beings capable of hope for others and each other. The first recruit welcomed to their new Corps is Saint Walker, who assists them by beginning a chain of new Blue Lanterns inducted sector by sector. Among Ganthet and Sayd's plans to combat "The Blackest Night" are to have Hal Jordan lead the Blue Lantern Corps (powering the entire organization with his willpower), and also to form an alliance with the Indigo Tribe.

Blackest Night

At the end of the Agent Orange plot line in Green Lantern, Ganthet, Sayd, and the Blue Lanterns find themselves being attacked by a platoon of Orange Lanterns led by a construct of Larfleeze, who has arrived on Odym (by proxy) to obtain a blue power ring. They are eventually rescued by Hal Jordan, who is accompanied by Carol Ferris, Sinestro, and Indigo-1. The reason for the Orange Lantern avatars disappearing is revealed to be the Black Lantern rings reviving Larfleeze's many victims on his world of Okaara, forcing him to use his orange constructs to defend himself. The visitors take Saint Walker, Ganthet, and Sayd to locate the real Larfleeze and Atrocitus in their goal of gathering a member from each Corps in order to create the white light (composed of each of the seven lights of the emotional spectrum) that will destroy the Black Lantern Corps. Both characters are resistant in joining the uncomfortable allegiance. Larfleeze demands his own Guardian after learning that the Green, Blue, and Black Lantern Corps each have one. In order to placate and recruit him to their cause, Sayd offers to relinquish her freedom and pledge her devotion to him if he agrees to accompany them (despite Ganthet's protest). After arriving at Coast City, Sayd and Ganthet are two of the heroes who make a stand against Nekron and his army, including an attempt to free the Guardians of Oa trapped by Scar in the Black Central Power Battery.

At the conclusion of the Blackest Night after Nekron's defeat, Sayd willingly goes with Larfleeze when the master of avarice claims her as his own, much to the protestation of Ganthet. Sayd explains to Ganthet that she believes she may be able to help Larfleeze and that they should be discussing the future of the Blue Lantern Corps, as Sayd is going with Larfleeze and Ganthet to the Green Lantern Honor Guard.

Brightest Day
Sayd, now wearing a robe emblazoned with the symbol of avarice, is seen accompanying Larfleeze while the Orange Lantern questions Lex Luthor. Later it was revealed that she was sent on a secret mission by Larfleeze. In the aftermath of the War of the Green Lantern Corps, Ganthet, who had lost a hand during the conflict, is approached by Saint Walker. While Sayd did not made a direct appearance, as her current whereabouts remains unknown, the Blue Lantern created an image of her while he restored Ganthet's hand, revealing that Ganthet still misses her.

The New 52
Sayd has since returned to Larfleeze's side, her mission revealed to be actually an investigation search for the strange disturbance that was stealing the rings from the different lantern corps, after it attempted to steal Larfleeze's ring. Due to Larfleeze's strong connection to his ring, he managed to retain his hold of it which prompted him to send the Glomulus construct posing as the ring instead and send Sayd to trace the source of the power. Sayd traveled to the center of Okaara's galaxy where a massive white hole had formed and was acting as a gateway to another universe and leaking matter from it into ours. She also saw a ship emerge from the white hole that was as large as a solar system and sensed a new antagonist the likes of which has never been seen before. This ship, aptly dubbed the Orrery, is where Kyle and the New Guardians will need to focus their attention if they want to know who stole the power rings and why.

Sayd has since revealed herself to be the one behind the ring thefts, a tactic used to bring the New Guardians together and notes that Kyle is the only being she knows capable of bringing together the powers of all of the branches of the emotional spectrum, while trying to save Ganthet from the Guardians of the Universe. She is seemingly killed saving Kyle, Carol, Arkillo and Larfleeze from the 'Third Army' attackers, but Sinestro later reunites and exiles Sayd and Ganthet, both alive and well. They were last seen observing Kyle Rayner, and later took residence on the planet Nok where they were sought by Hal Jordan's ring, after the apparent death of the latter.

DC Rebirth
During the events of the Phantom Lantern storyline, Ganthet and Sayd are shown to attempt to resurrect the Blue Lantern Corps with the assistance of Saint Walker, the last Blue Lantern, and the White Lantern Corps. Although the ritual was progressing well it ultimately failed due to interference by an unknown being of great power who was meddling in space and time, later shown to be Perpetua. Saint Walker leaves and says he will search for Hope in all the corners of the universe. Sayd is later seen back on Odym, the former base of the Blue Lantern Corps, where she dies when the rogue Guardian of the Universe Koyos, decided to destroy all remnants of anything Maltusian from the Universe. After infusing himself with the energies of magic, the emotional spectrum and anti-chaos, Koyos targeted and destroies the planets Zamaron, Maltus, the Helix (base of the Controllers) and Odym.

In other media

Television
 Sayd appears in Green Lantern: The Animated Series, voiced by Susan Blakeslee.

Film
 Sayd appears in the 2011 film Green Lantern.

References

See also
Ganthet

Comics characters introduced in 2004
Characters created by Geoff Johns
DC Comics aliens
DC Comics extraterrestrial superheroes
DC Comics deities
DC Comics female superheroes
DC Comics film characters
DC Comics characters who are shapeshifters
Characters created by Joe Kelly
Characters created by Judd Winick
Comics characters introduced in 2007
Fictional characters who can manipulate reality 
Fictional characters who can manipulate time 
Fictional characters who can manipulate light
Fictional characters with death or rebirth abilities
Fictional characters with energy-manipulation abilities
Fictional characters with immortality 
Fictional characters with superhuman senses
Fictional characters who can change size 
Fictional characters who can turn intangible
Fictional characters with elemental transmutation abilities
DC Comics characters who have mental powers
Fictional illusionists
DC Comics characters who can teleport
DC Comics telekinetics
DC Comics telepaths